Phryneta luctuosa is a species of beetle in the family Cerambycidae, also called lamiines or flat-faced longhorned beetles. It was described by Murray in 1870. It is known from Cameroon and Nigeria.

References

Phrynetini
Beetles described in 1870